Pyrausta bisignata is a moth in the family Crambidae. It was described by Arthur Gardiner Butler in 1889. It is found in the north-western Himalayas.

References

Moths described in 1889
bisignata
Moths of Asia